Seufzer eines Ungeliebten – Gegenliebe (Sigh of an unloved – Love requited), WoO 118, is a secular cantata for voice and piano by Ludwig van Beethoven, composed at the end of 1794 or in 1795 from two complementary poems combined into one from the collection Lyrische Gedichte (1789) by Gottfried August Bürger. Beethoven offered it to the publisher Peters of Leipzig in a letter from 5 June 1822, but it was only published posthumously in 1837 by Anton Diabelli.

The work was written shortly after Beethoven's arrival in Vienna in November 1793 to take lessons from Joseph Haydn, who also set the Gegenliebe to music (Hob. XVIIa: 16). The sketches are mixed with that of another song, Adelaide. It is also the period of a young man's first love:

"In Vienna, at least for as long as I lived there, Beethoven was still engaged in romantic relationships, and at that time he had made conquests which would have been very difficult, if not impossible, for more than one Adonis. - Can a man, without having known love in its most intimate mysteries, have composed Adelaide, Fidelio and so many other works? […] I will note again that, as far as I know, all the objects of his passions were of a high rank."

- Franz Gerhard Wegeler, Biographical notes on Ludwig van Beethoven, p. 43-447.

Gegenliebe marks the first appearance of the melody that Beethoven will use in the Fantaisie chorale opus 80 for piano, choir and orchestra in 1808, which is a foreshadowing of the "Ode to Joy" from the Ninth Symphony.

References
Notes

Sources

External links

, Peter Schreier (tenor), Norman Shetler (piano)

1794 compositions
1795 compositions
Song cycles by Ludwig van Beethoven
Compositions in C minor